Simon Njoroge (24 October 1993 – 30 August 2015), popularly known as Shrekeezy, was a Kenyan advertising strategist. He was also largely involved in art and entertainment as a radio host, TV presenter, rapper, DJ and Entertainment Executive. He first gained major attention for his successful online radio show Shrekeezy Live which was later taken up as a daily radio show on Hero Radio Kenya after gaining over 40,000 fans  on social media. As a marketing executive at Hero Radio, Simon developed huge interest on Internet marketing and took part-time classes with Chartered Institute of Marketing. During this period, he played a major role in marketing muicbook.com, a social networking site that was founded by his colleague and close friend Samuel Keige. The site was however sold to Afroleo.com. He left Kenya a year later to be the personal assistant of Tanzania-based Indian entrepreneur Nilesh Bhatt. He later that year joined Pilipili Entertainment, a Tanzanian film production company owned by Nilesh Bhatt as the marketing manager. He had since worked as a Digital Strategist in major East African Advertising agencies like Scanad, MetropolitanRepublic, Express DDB and BrandVision Advertising.

As an entrepreneur and investor, Shrekeezy co-owned Trans Africa events, an event organizing company based in Tanzania and is the founder and acting CEO of Phorex East Africa a modelling and PR agency operating across the East Africa region. He founded The Nigerian Festival in Tanzania( Naija Fest), Tanzania Social Media Awards(TSOMA Awards) and the upcoming East Africa Awards known as Mashariki Awards to be held in December 2015 at the Carnivore Nairobi. He was also largely involved in planning the Club Music Video Awards in Uganda in 2013 in partnership with ROCKSTAR4000/Sony MUSIC AFRICA.

On the morning of 29 August 2015. Shrekeezy decided to take a boat ride from Whitesands Hotel to Mbundya island in Dar Tanzania before drowning.

Before dying, Shreekezy posted a photo of the same island that took his life on Instagram captioned; "The boat ride from #WhiteSandsHotel to #MbundyaIsland is the scariest thing I’ve experienced in a long time,But am here……..#TanzaniaDay8." His body went missing after the ordeal but was found after a three-day-search.

Life and career

Early life(Music Artist) 

Shrekeezy was born Simon Njoroge in Nakuru, Kenya. He is from a family of three. He developed an interest in technology and art at age 10. After completing his secondary school Education, he moved to Nairobi at the age of 17. During this period, Simon got to meet several stakeholders in the Kenyan music industry who inspired him to join the Kenyan media. He regularly appeared on the WAPI(Words And Pictures) Concert Freestyle battles where he met media personalities that helped circulate his music.

Shrekeezy met up with Kenyan popular MC and media personality DNG  who grew interest to his music and called him up for a radio interview at a Kenyan popular radio station 97.1 One FM where he was an evening radio host of the Fired Up Radio show. DNG played a big role in circulating his music during the time. He later went back to his hometown Nakuru for a while where he learn of a radio station being launched. He developed interest in radio hosting, inspired and motivated by DNG, he approached the radio station for a possible spot for a HIPHOP Show. The owners of the station were pleased by Shrekeezy's presentation during his first meeting and instantly gave him the spot. It is said he started the show SHREKEEZY LIVE the very same day. SHREKEEZY LIVE grew to be one of the biggest radio shows in the region and earned him great popularity.

He quit the media after becoming a prolific digital strategist in Nairobi, he later moved to Dar es Salaam and the Kampala working with leading brands in the regions including Pilsner Ice, Tusker Lager, Kenya Commercial Bank, Airtel, Samsung Mobile, MTN Uganda, and Coca-Cola.

Music career: Down For My City #DFMC
In February 2014, Shrekeezy released the single down for my city   featuring various African artists from 5 countries. The artists included the leading female rapper in the East Africa region Stella Mwangi, US based Kenyan rapper Kanja, Nigeria's afropop artists Wondaboy, Award-winning Ghanaian actress Juliet Ibrahim and UK Based Sierra Leone musician and music Producer Silvastone. The song received major airplay in various African countries and topped charts in South Africa, Botswana, Kenya and Sierra Leone.

Death
He mysteriously disappeared in Tanzania on 30 August 2015, where he was living and working and found dead two days later. He had drowned on Saturday near Mbudya Island, off the Dar es Salaam coast in Tanzania. His body was found on Tuesday after a three-day search, according to a relative.

His remains were buried at his parents home in Kabatini area in Nakuru County, Kenya on 5 September 2015.

Influences 

Shrekeezy stated that the artists who have influenced his musical style include artist such as T.I., Lil Wayne, Rick Ross and Meek Mill. He's also inspired by Wiz Khalifa, Nicki Minaj, Big Sean, D'banj, Ice Prince and Lil Wayne.

Shrekeezy cited Jay-Z and Kanye West as his major influences, on an interview, he once said;

On his media career (i.e. radio and TV), Shrekeezy has cited Tim Westwood of BBC Radio 1, Ellen DeGeneres of The Ellen Show as his major influences

Activism
Shrekeezy had played a major role in bringing together different corporates, organisations and companies to support JIKINGE campaign, a HIV Aids youth awareness program he founded in 2012.

Performances

Awards and nominations

Discography

Mixtapes

Singles

Featured singles

Filmography

References

External links

Rapper Shrekeezy aliyewahi kufanya kazi na Navy Kenzo afariki kwa kuzama baharini Mbudya
 Young Artiste Ready to Take Kenya by Storm 

1993 births
2015 deaths
Kenyan Christians
Kenyan male film actors
American music industry executives
Hip hop singers
Midwest hip hop musicians
Kenyan rappers
Kenyan musicians
Kisima Music Award winners
Alumni of Strathmore School
Interscope Records artists
Atlantic Records artists
Kenyan male television actors
People from Nakuru County
21st-century Kenyan male actors
Deaths by drowning